The Mawdaw Myintha Pagoda  (commonly known as Myo Daung Pagoda or Myo Daunt Pagoda (မြို့ထောင့်စေတီ)) is a Buddhist pagoda located in Shwebo,  Myanmar. Located five kilometers northeast of Shwebo, the pagoda was modeled after the Shwemawdaw Pagoda in Bago. It was founded by King Alaungpaya, who commissioned the construction of the pagoda after his May 1757 conquest of the city. Construction took ten months.

References 

Buildings and structures in Sagaing Region
Buddhist temples in Myanmar